Café Opera is a café and nightclub in Stockholm, Sweden in the Royal Swedish Opera building and part of the Opera Cellar (Operakällaren). It serves as a bistro, brasserie and tearoom during the day but becomes one of Sweden's most famous and busiest nightclubs after 10pm. It opened in 1980. On the ceiling are paintings by Vicke Andrén.

The club is also a former football club named FC Café Opera, founded in 1991 and which played in the Swedish Second League until 2005 when it merged with Väsby IK to form FC Väsby United.

References

External links
Official site

Nightclubs in Stockholm
1980 establishments in Sweden
Restaurants in Stockholm
Coffeehouses and cafés in Sweden